The DMJ Pick Bridge is a Parker through truss bridge located near Saratoga, Wyoming, which carries Carbon County Road CN6-508 across the North Platte River. The bridge was built from 1909 to 1910 by contractor Charles G. Sheely; it was originally located south of Fort Steele. In 1934, the bridge was moved up the river to its current location, as a new bridge had been built at its original site five years earlier. The bridge is the only Parker truss bridge remaining in Wyoming, after the Arvada Bridge was replaced in 1990.

The bridge was added to the National Register of Historic Places on February 22, 1985. It was one of several bridges added to the NRHP for its role in the history of Wyoming bridge construction.

See also
EAU Arvada Bridge, the other remaining Parker truss bridge in Wyoming
List of bridges documented by the Historic American Engineering Record in Wyoming

References

External links

Pick Bridge at the Wyoming State Historic Preservation Office

Road bridges on the National Register of Historic Places in Wyoming
Bridges completed in 1909
Buildings and structures in Carbon County, Wyoming
Historic American Engineering Record in Wyoming
National Register of Historic Places in Carbon County, Wyoming
Steel bridges in the United States
Parker truss bridges in the United States